Lucas de Deus Santos (born 9 October 1982), known as Cacá, is a Brazilian professional footballer who plays for Esporte Clube Santo André as a midfielder.

Club career
Born in Belo Horizonte, Minas Gerais, Cacá started his career with hometown's Clube Atlético Mineiro. During his spell with the Galo, he was also loaned twice: in the 2003–04 season he played with MSV Duisburg in the German second division, being sparingly used as the club finished in seventh position.

In early 2006, Cacá signed with AaB Fodbold from Clube de Regatas Brasil. He only appeared in two Danish Superliga games in his third year due to injury, as the Aalborg side won the national championship after a nine-year wait. Back to full fitness in 2008–09, he helped it reach the final in the Danish Cup; additionally, on 25 November 2008, he scored the 1–1 equalizer in a UEFA Champions League group stage contest against Celtic, in an eventual 2–1 win which saw the hosts leapfrog the Scots for the third place in Group E, with the subsequent qualification to the UEFA Cup.

On 5 July 2009, Cacá moved clubs but stayed in Denmark, signing a three-year contract with Odense BK for around 4 million Danish kroner. In his only full season with the team he contributed with 17 starts and three goals to an eventual second position, which qualified to the Europa League.

Cacá and Odense mutually terminated the player's contract on 14 January 2011. In the last day of the winter transfer window he signed with U.D. Leiria in Portugal, joining a host of compatriots at the top division side.

International career
Cacá played all the games for Brazil at the 1999 FIFA U-17 World Championship in New Zealand, scoring in the quarterfinals against Paraguay (4–1 win) as the national team won the tournament.

Personal life
Cacá's older brothers, Dedé and Leandro, were also footballers. Both shared teams at Atlético Mineiro and Borussia Dortmund, with very different individual fates however.

References

External links

Danish Superliga stats 
Career stats at Danmarks Radio 

1982 births
Living people
Footballers from Belo Horizonte
Brazilian footballers
Association football midfielders
Campeonato Brasileiro Série A players
Clube Atlético Mineiro players
Sport Club do Recife players
Clube de Regatas Brasil players
Sociedade Esportiva e Recreativa Caxias do Sul players
Comercial Futebol Clube (Ribeirão Preto) players
Esporte Clube Santo André players
Associação Desportiva São Caetano players
2. Bundesliga players
MSV Duisburg players
Danish Superliga players
AaB Fodbold players
Odense Boldklub players
Primeira Liga players
U.D. Leiria players
Brazil youth international footballers
Brazilian expatriate footballers
Expatriate footballers in Germany
Expatriate men's footballers in Denmark
Expatriate footballers in Portugal
Brazilian expatriate sportspeople in Denmark
Brazilian expatriate sportspeople in Portugal